Ida Maria Magdalena Hoffmann (born 16 September 1947 in Karasburg, ǁKaras Region) is a Namibian politician. She served as a member of the 6th National Assembly from 2015 to 2020. Prior to that, from 2005 to 2010  she was selected  by president Hifikepunye Pohamba as a non-voting member of the 4th National Assembly of Namibia.  Hoffman was active in SWAPO in the 1980s. She founded the Children's World Creche in Katutura in 1984 and has been involved in the Roman Catholic Church since 1962. In 1990, Hoffman studied project development at the Pan African Institute for Development in Zambia. She has also served as chairperson of the Nama Genocide Technical Committee in Windhoek.

References

1947 births
Living people
Politicians from Windhoek
Namibian Roman Catholics
People from ǁKaras Region
Namibian people of German descent
SWAPO politicians
Namibian expatriates in Zambia
21st-century Namibian women politicians
20th-century Namibian politicians
21st-century Namibian politicians